Jean-Joseph Kombous Njock  is a Cameroonian professional footballer who plays as a forward.

References

Living people
KAC Kénitra players
Fath Union Sport players
Cameroonian footballers
Cameroonian expatriate footballers
Cameroonian expatriates in Morocco
1995 births
Association football forwards